Lycosoides is a genus of Mediterranean funnel weavers first described by Hippolyte Lucas in 1846.

Species
 it contains fourteen species:

Lycosoides caparti (de Blauwe, 1980) – Morocco, Algeria, Tunisia
Lycosoides coarctata (Dufour, 1831) – Canary Is., Mediterranean
Lycosoides crassivulva (Denis, 1954) – Morocco
Lycosoides flavomaculata Lucas, 1846 – Mediterranean
Lycosoides incisofemoralis Bosmans, 2022 – Algeria
Lycosoides instabilis (Denis, 1954) – Morocco, Algeria
Lycosoides kabyliana Bosmans, 2022 – Algeria
Lycosoides lehtineni Marusik & Guseinov, 2003 – Azerbaijan
Lycosoides leprieuri (Simon, 1875) – Algeria, Tunisia
Lycosoides murphyorum Bosmans, 2022 – Morocco
Lycosoides parva (Denis, 1954) – Morocco
Lycosoides robertsi Bosmans, 2022 – Tunisia
Lycosoides saiss Bosmans, 2022 – Morocco
Lycosoides variegata (Simon, 1870) – Spain, Gibraltar, Morocco, Algeria

References

External links

Agelenidae
Araneomorphae genera